Keith Mitchell Closs Jr. (born April 3, 1976) is an American former professional basketball player. He played at the center position.

College career

Professional career

Los Angeles Clippers (1997–2000) 
Closs played three seasons as a backup center for the National Basketball Association's Los Angeles Clippers from 1997 to 2000, averaging 3.9 points, 2.9 rebounds and 1.3 blocks per game during his spell.

After starting playing professionally in the Atlantic Basketball Association with the Norwich Neptunes, Closs moved to the Clippers in 1997. Having logged career highs in points, rebounds, assists and steals during 1999–2000, his NBA career abruptly ended, with a club record for most blocked shots per 48 minutes (4.7).

Pennsylvania Valley Dawgs (2003–2007) 
Closs later played for the Pennsylvania Valley Dawgs of the USBL in 2003, subsequently moving to the CBA.

Buffalo Silverbacks (2007) 
In January 2007, as he led the latter league in blocks per game at 2.9, he left and signed with the Buffalo Silverbacks of the ABA.

Tulsa 66ers (2007) 
Closs was selected with the 11th pick in the 5th round of the 2007 NBA Development League draft by the Tulsa 66ers.

Yunnan Bulls (2008) 
In December 2008, Closs signed with the Chinese league's Yunnan Bulls, and averaged 16.1 points, 11.9 rebounds and 5.9 blocked shots per game.

Personal life
Closs is the oldest of six children. His favorite book is Giant Steps by Kareem Abdul-Jabbar.

Closs admitted to being an alcoholic, even before joining the Clippers. The pressure of the NBA only led to more drinking and after three DUI offenses, he sought help in 2007. During a 2008 interview, he said he had turned his life around, having given up the addiction for good.

His father, Keith Mitchell Closs Sr. died on December 1, 2017, from a possible heart attack, according to Closs's Twitter account.

Closs also has a son, Keith M. Closs III, born January 21, 2000.

In  August 2022, Closs became an assistant coach in the Turkish basketball league

Closs has the fifth lowest BMI of all players in NBA history.

Career statistics

NBA

Source

Regular season

|-
| align="left" | 1997–98
| align="left" | L.A. Clippers
| 58 || 1 || 12.8 || .449 || – || .597 || 2.9 || .3 || .2 || 1.4 || 4.0
|-
| align="left" | 1998–99
| align="left" | L.A. Clippers
| 15 || 0 || 5.8 || .522 || .000 || .800 || 1.7 || .0 || .2 || .6 || 2.1
|-
| align="left" | 1999–2000
| align="left" | L.A. Clippers
| 57 || 6 || 14.4 || .487 || .000 || .590 || 3.1 || .4 || .2 || 1.3 || 4.2
|-
| style="text-align:left;"| Career
| style="text-align:left;"|
| 130 || 7 || 12.7 || .471 || .000 || .606 || 2.9 || .3 || .2 || 1.3 || 3.9

See also
List of tallest players in National Basketball Association history
List of NCAA Division I men's basketball players with 13 or more blocks in a game
List of NCAA Division I men's basketball season blocks leaders

References

External links
NBA.com profile
Stats at BasketballReference
College stats at Sportsstats
NBDL statistics

1976 births
Living people
African-American basketball players
American expatriate basketball people in China
American men's basketball players
Basketball players from Hartford, Connecticut
Centers (basketball)
Central Connecticut Blue Devils men's basketball players
Chinese Basketball Association players
Harlem Globetrotters players
Los Angeles Clippers players
Rockford Lightning players
Tulsa 66ers players
Undrafted National Basketball Association players
21st-century African-American sportspeople
20th-century African-American sportspeople